Vladimir Goryaev (born 19 May 1939) was a Soviet athlete who competed mainly in the triple jump. He trained at Dynamo in Minsk.

He competed for the USSR in the 1960 Summer Olympics held in Rome, Italy in the triple jump where he won the silver medal.

References

Sports Reference

1939 births
Living people
Soviet male triple jumpers
Olympic silver medalists for the Soviet Union
Athletes (track and field) at the 1960 Summer Olympics
Olympic athletes of the Soviet Union
Dynamo sports society athletes
Medalists at the 1960 Summer Olympics
Olympic silver medalists in athletics (track and field)